The 1972 Portland–Vancouver tornadoes were caused by an unusually intense squall line with embedded strong tornadoes that struck Oregon and Washington on Wednesday, April 5, 1972. Of the four tornadoes, the most catastrophic event was a deadly F3 tornado that struck Portland, Oregon, and Vancouver, Washington, the first F3 tornado to strike Oregon since June 3, 1894. It was tied as the deadliest tornado in the United States in 1972 and remains the deadliest tornado in the history of the Pacific Northwest. In all, the outbreak killed six, injured 301, and caused $25.55 million in damage.

Meteorological synopsis
A sharp cold front triggered an intense squall line that moved into the Pacific Northwest during the late morning hours of April 5, 1972. After moving inland, the storms produced strong winds, large hail, and tornadoes to the region.

Confirmed tornadoes

April 5 event

Portland, Oregon/Vancouver, Washington

The National Weather Service tracked a very turbulent squall line of thunderstorms moving northeasterly across Portland, Oregon, the strongest of which was near the city of Tigard. The tornado formed from this storm and touched down near the edge of the Columbia River, moving 1½ miles before crossing the river. The tornado was difficult to observe because of the fog and the mud and flying debris drawn up by the tornado. After making landfall on the Washington side of the river, it continued its  journey before dissipating. The storm was classed as a tornado by the National Weather Service on April 6.

In Portland, Oregon, the tornado damaged four boat moorings and 50 small boats.  Damage in Oregon from the tornado totaled up to $250,000 (1972 USD).
Vancouver, Washington suffered the most significant damage from the tornado. The tornado struck east Vancouver at 12:51 p.m. (PST) on April 5, 1972, where it destroyed a grocery store, along with Peter S. Ogden Elementary School injuring 70 students.  Nearby, the storm demolished a bowling alley, a drive-in theater screen and damaged around 100 homes, some severely. Trees and power lines were downed and several vehicles were flipped as well. The Oregon National Guard and the Oregon State Police crossed the state border to help transport the injured and direct traffic in the aftermath of the tornado.

Non-tornadic events
High winds brought by the thunderstorms caused minimal tree damage. In Tigard, the thunderstorm that spawned the tornado tore the roof off a warehouse and damaged several parked cars.

Aftermath
Overall, the Portland–Vancouver F3 tornado killed six people and left $25.25 million (1972 USD) in damage.

See also
List of North American tornadoes and tornado outbreaks
2008 Vancouver, Washington tornado

Notes

References

F3 tornadoes
Tornadoes of 1972
Tornadoes in Oregon
Tornadoes in Washington (state)
1972 in Oregon
1972 in Washington (state)
History of Vancouver, Washington
April 1972 events in North America